Balaji Prakash (born 1968) is an Indian structural biologist, biochemist and the Associate Dean of Sciences & Professor, Biological and Life Sciences, at the School of Arts and Sciences, Ahmedabad University, since July 2020. Prior to this he served as senior principal scientist and the head of the department of molecular nutrition of the Central Food Technological Research Institute. Known for elucidating the structure of a unique GTP-binding protein, Prakash is an elected fellow of the National Academy of Sciences, India and was a senior research fellow of The Wellcome Trust, UK. The Department of Biotechnology of the Government of India awarded him the National Bioscience Award for Career Development, one of the highest Indian science awards, for his contributions to biosciences, in 2009.

Biography 

Balaji Prakash, born in 1968, did his doctoral studies at the Indian Institute of Science and after securing a PhD in 1996, he completed his post-doctoral work at Max Planck Institute of Molecular Physiology in 2002. Returning to India, he joined Jawaharlal Nehru University the same year as an assistant professor at the Special Center for Molecular Medicine but his stay there lasted only 7 months. In November 2002, he joined the Indian Institute of Technology, Kanpur at their Department of Biological Sciences and Bio-Engineering where he later served as an associate professor from 2005 to 2010 and as a professor from 2010 to 2014. It was at this time, he took a long leave from the institute to join the Department of Molecular Nutrition of the Central Food Technological Research Institute as a senior principal scientist, a position he holds to date. He also serves as a CSIR recognized faculty at the Academy of Scientific and Innovative Research.

Career 
Prakash's research focus is on enzyme catalysis, with special interest in the enzyme family composed of GTPases, kinases and sugar nucleotidyltransferases, as well as the development of peptides for food industry. During his post-doctoral work at the Max Planck Institute of Molecular Physiology, he elucidated the structure of a GTP-binding protein. At CFTRI, he has worked on molecular nutrition and the development of nutraceuticals and has developed a technology titled Microbes based printing for fabrication of electronic circuits for which he holds the patent; another of his invention, A novel device for crystallizing proteins and protein complexes or other biological macromolecules, is being prepared for patent submission. His studies have been documented by way of a number of articles and ResearchGate, an online repository of scientific articles has listed 55 of them. Besides, he has delivered invited speeches at seminars including the 2nd Indo-American Frontiers of Science Symposium held at Irvine, California in 2006 and was a senior research fellow of the Wellcome Trust in 2004.

Awards and honors 
The Department of Biotechnology (DBT) of the Government of India awarded him the National Bioscience Award for Career Development, one of the highest Indian science awards in 2009. In 2011, he was elected as a member of the Guha Research Conference and the National Academy of Sciences, Indiaelected him as a fellow in 2013.

Selected bibliography

See also 

 Bowman–Birk protease inhibitor
 Dolichos lablab

Notes

References

External links 
 

N-BIOS Prize recipients
Indian scientific authors
Living people
Scientists from Mysore
Indian biochemists
Indian Institute of Science alumni
Academic staff of IIT Kanpur
Max Planck Society alumni
Academic staff of Jawaharlal Nehru University
1968 births